Brandon Wilson may refer to:

Brandon Wilson (American football) (born 1994), American football safety
Brandon Wilson (soccer) (born 1997), Australian soccer player
Brandon Wilson (writer) (born 1953), American travel writer